Aphractia is a genus of flies belonging to the family Asilidae.

Species:
Aphractia longicornis (Hermann, 1912)
Aphractia rubida (Hermann, 1912)
Aphractia vivax (Hermann, 1912)

References

Asilidae